Booker Bay is a suburb of the Central Coast region of New South Wales Australia south-east of Woy Woy on Brisbane Water, about  north of Sydney. It is part of the  local government area.

References

Suburbs of the Central Coast (New South Wales)
Bays of New South Wales